This is a list of more than 100 species in Delphacodes, a genus of delphacid planthoppers in the family Delphacidae.

Delphacodes species

 Delphacodes aculeata Beamer, 1948
 Delphacodes acuministyla Dozier, 1926
 Delphacodes agropyri Ishihara, 1949
 Delphacodes amblystylis Fennah, 1956
 Delphacodes angulata Beamer, 1947
 Delphacodes anthracina (Horvath, 1909)
 Delphacodes anufrievi Wilson, 1992
 Delphacodes apicata Beamer, 1948
 Delphacodes arcuata Beamer, 1948
 Delphacodes argentina De Remes, Lenikov & Teson, 1979
 Delphacodes aterrima Muir, 1926
 Delphacodes atrior (Fowler, 1905)
 Delphacodes audrasi Ribaut, 1954
 Delphacodes axillaris (Sahlberg, 1876)
 Delphacodes balli Muir & Giffard, 1924
 Delphacodes banosensis Muir, 1926
 Delphacodes bellicosa Muir & Giffard, 1924
 Delphacodes bergi (Scott, 1881)
 Delphacodes bocana Beamer, 1946
 Delphacodes burjata (Kusnezov, 1929)
 Delphacodes caerulata Beamer, 1947
 Delphacodes capnodes (Scott, 1870)  (Weißlippen-Spornzikade)
 Delphacodes carinata (Glover, 1877)
 Delphacodes catilina Fennah, 1958
 Delphacodes cayamensis (Crawford, 1914)
 Delphacodes celaeno Fennah, 1956
 Delphacodes cerberus Fennah, 1957
 Delphacodes chiloensis Muir, 1929
 Delphacodes choroebus Fennah, 1958
 Delphacodes conspicua (Horvath, 1904)
 Delphacodes culta (Van Duzee, 1907)
 Delphacodes curvistyla Dozier, 1926
 Delphacodes darwini Muir, 1929
 Delphacodes dentis Beamer, 1948
 Delphacodes distanti Metcalf, 1943
 Delphacodes elongatus Teson, De Remes & Lenicov, 1983
 Delphacodes esakii Matsumura & Ishihara, 1945
 Delphacodes fascia (Lindberg, 1960)
 Delphacodes flava Metcalf, 1943
 Delphacodes flavida (Melichar, 1903)
 Delphacodes framarib Asche & Remane, 1983
 Delphacodes fukuokae Ishihara, 1949
 Delphacodes furcata (Provancher, 1872)
 Delphacodes fuscifrons (Fieber, 1879)
 Delphacodes gilveola (Kirschbaum, 1868)
 Delphacodes gluciophila Muir, 1926
 Delphacodes gracilis (Matsumura, 1915)
 Delphacodes graminis Lindberg, 1958
 Delphacodes hemiptera (Germar, 1818)
 Delphacodes indentistyla Dozier, 1926
 Delphacodes ixion Fennah, 1958
 Delphacodes kahavalu Kirkaldy, 1906
 Delphacodes koebelei Muir & Giffard, 1924
 Delphacodes kotonis (Matsumura, 1940)
 Delphacodes kuscheli Fennah, 1955
 Delphacodes lappae Beamer, 1946
 Delphacodes latifrons (Puton, 1875)
 Delphacodes latus De Remes, Lenikov & Teson, 1979
 Delphacodes leptypha (Amyot, 1847)
 Delphacodes linnavuori (Le Quense, 1960)
 Delphacodes livida Beamer, 1948
 Delphacodes marginalis (Motschulsky, 1863)
 Delphacodes marginicornis (Fowler, 1905)
 Delphacodes mcateei Muir & Giffard, 1924
 Delphacodes melanocephala (Fieber, 1879)
 Delphacodes mesada Caldwell, 1951
 Delphacodes modesta (Fieber, 1866)
 Delphacodes muirella Metcalf, 1943
 Delphacodes muirianus Izzard, 1936
 Delphacodes mulsanti (Fieber, 1866)
 Delphacodes nastasi Asche & Remane, 1983
 Delphacodes nigerrima Ishihara, 1949
 Delphacodes nigrinota Beamer, 1951
 Delphacodes nigripennata Beamer, 1946
 Delphacodes ornatipennis (Haupt, 1927)
 Delphacodes pacifica (Crawford, 1914)
 Delphacodes pallidula (Melichar, 1903)
 Delphacodes paludicola Muir, 1926
 Delphacodes parvistylus Muir, 1929
 Delphacodes patruelis (Stal, 1859)
 Delphacodes penepuella Beamer, 1948
 Delphacodes platystylus Muir, 1930
 Delphacodes quadridentis Beamer, 1948
 Delphacodes quadrispinosa Muir & Giffard, 1924
 Delphacodes radiata (Costa, 1834)
 Delphacodes rectangularis (Crawford, 1914)
 Delphacodes recurvata Beamer, 1948
 Delphacodes reducta (Van Duzee, 1907)
 Delphacodes rivularis (Germar, 1830)
 Delphacodes sabrina Fennah, 1958
 Delphacodes saccharicola Muir, 1926
 Delphacodes sagata (Fowler, 1905)
 Delphacodes saxicola Muir, 1926
 Delphacodes schinias Asche & Remane, 1983
 Delphacodes scolochloa Cronin & Wilson, 2007
 Delphacodes securigera Muir, 1926
 Delphacodes selkirki Fennah, 1955
 Delphacodes seminigra (Stal, 1854)
 Delphacodes semiobscura Metcalf, 1943
 Delphacodes shermani (Metcalf, 1923)
 Delphacodes silvae Beamer, 1946
 Delphacodes sitarea De Remes, Lenikov & Teson, 1979
 Delphacodes spinosus Teson & de Remes Lenicov, 1983
 Delphacodes staminata (Metcalf, 1923)
 Delphacodes stigmaticalis (Curtis, 1837)
 Delphacodes stricklandi Metcalf, 1946
 Delphacodes sucinea Beamer, 1948
 Delphacodes tapina (Fieber, 1866)
 Delphacodes thersander Fennah, 1956
 Delphacodes trimaculata Beamer, 1948
 Delphacodes truncata Beamer, 1948
 Delphacodes turgida Beamer, 1948
 Delphacodes uncinata (Fieber, 1866)
 Delphacodes unistrigosa (Motschulsky, 1863)
 Delphacodes univittata (Berg, 1879)
 Delphacodes venosus (Germar, 1830)
 Delphacodes waldeni (Metcalf, 1923)
 Delphacodes walkeri Metcalf, 1943
 Delphacodes xerophila Muir, 1926

References

Delphacodes
Articles created by Qbugbot